Conostylis aurea, commonly known as golden conostylis, is a plant in the bloodwort family Haemodoraceae. It is endemic to the south-west of Western Australia.

Description
Conostylis aurea is a rhizomatous, tufted perennial, grass-like herb. As with others in the genus, the leaves are strap-like and the flowers occur in clusters on stalks which arise from the base of the leaves. There are six tepals and six stamens, one at the base of each tepal-lobe.
In his notes on his original description of the species, John Lindley noted "Conostylis abounds the most in species, some of which are handsome but others are mere weeds..... C. aurea is a much handsomer species....flowers of a bright golden yellow."

Taxonomy and naming
The species was first formally described in 1840 by botanist John Lindley in A Sketch of the Vegetation of the Swan River Colony. The specific epithet (aurea) is derived from the Latin word aurum meaning "gold".

Distribution
The golden conostylis occurs in the Avon Wheatbelt, Esperance Plains, Geraldton Sandplains, Jarrah Forest and Swan Coastal Plain biogeographical regions of Western Australia. It grows on white or yellow sand or gravelly loam in winter-wet situations.

Conservation
Conostylis aurea is classified as not threatened by the Western Australian Government Department of Parks and Wildlife.

References

aurea
Commelinales of Australia
Angiosperms of Western Australia
Endemic flora of Western Australia
Plants described in 1810